Pavel Valoušek (born 19 April 1979) is a Czech professional rally driver who currently competes in the Czech Rally Championship with Škoda Fabia S2000 in factory supported team.

Career

Valoušek was racing with Suzuki Ignis S1600 in 2005 JWRC and scored 10 points overally finishing 11th, his best result this year was 4th place in JWRC standings at Rally Mexico.

He continued racing in JWRC during 2006 season. He managed to get on JWRC podium this year with 3rd place at Rallye Deutschland. Valoušek scored 11 points this year and 15th place in JWRC standings.

Valoušek returned to Czech Rally Championship since 2007. He was racing with Mitsubishi Lancer Evo IX. In 2008 was chosen by Czech journalists to join BF Goodrich Drivers Team for Barum Rally Zlín, 6th round of IRC 2008. Valoušek finished 4th, being beat by Freddy Loix, Nicolas Vouilloz and Bryan Bouffier all driving Peugeot 207 S2000.

In season 2009 of Czech Rally Championship, Valoušek was again racing with Mitsubishi Lancer Evo IX. For Barum Rally Zlín he switched to Škoda Fabia S2000 and finished 6th overally.

In season 2010, Valoušek was racing with Škoda Fabia S2000 for factory supported rally team. He became Czech champion after winning 3 events out of 7. He managed to get on podium in IRC event. At 2010 Barum Czech Rally Zlín he finished 3rd after Freddy Loix and Juho Hanninen both at Škoda Fabia S2000.

WRC

PWRC results

JWRC results

IRC results

ERC results

Czech Rally Championship results

References

External links

Official website
Official website of Škoda Delimax Team
Profile at ewrc-results.com
Profile at IRC website

Living people
Czech rally drivers
World Rally Championship drivers
Intercontinental Rally Challenge drivers
European Rally Championship drivers
1979 births
People from Otrokovice
Sportspeople from the Zlín Region
Peugeot Sport drivers
Škoda Motorsport drivers